Norman Bailey (February 6, 1913 – July 11, 1984) was an American musician who was a member of the Lawrence Welk orchestra from 1952 to 1973.

Born in Worcester, Massachusetts; he took up music with his instrument of choice, the trumpet. He joined the Welk band in 1951 after spending seventeen years with the Freddy Martin band. Some of his most notable solo numbers during his tenure on the show include Sugar Blues and Hot Lips, he also gave one of his trumpets to one of his protégés Johnny Zell, who later became a member of the Welk orchestra.

References

External links 

American trumpeters
American male trumpeters
1913 births
1984 deaths
20th-century American musicians
Lawrence Welk
20th-century trumpeters
20th-century American male musicians